Nebria is a genus of ground beetles native to the Palearctic, the Near East and North Africa. There are more than 500 described species in Nebria.

See also
 List of Nebria species

References

External links

 Nebria at Fauna Europaea
 
 

 
Carabidae genera